John D. Weston, (born April 19, 1958) is a former Canadian politician, who was a Member of Parliament from 2008 to 2015, representing the electoral district of West Vancouver—Sunshine Coast—Sea to Sky Country. He is a member of the Conservative Party.

Weston studied International Relations at Harvard University, law at Osgoode Hall Law School, and is able to speak Mandarin as well as French and English. He then worked as a lawyer in Canada and in Taiwan. He is a founder of Pan Pacific Law Corporation and Access Law Group, as well as the Canadian Constitution Foundation.

Weston ran in the 2006 Canadian federal election but was defeated, by Blair Wilson. Weston lost by 1.5%, or 976 votes.

During the 40th Parliament, he served as a member of the Aboriginal Affairs, Fisheries, and Library of Parliament Standing Committees, and as the Government Liaison to the Persian and Iranian Community, and as the Vice Chair of the Conservative Community Relations Committee.

After being re-elected in the 2011 Canadian federal election, Weston has served on the Citizenship and Immigration Committee and as a member of the Official Languages Committee.

Weston introduced bill C-475, which amended the Controlled Drugs and Substances Act, to make it illegal to possess, produce, sell or import chemicals with the knowledge they will be used to create street drugs, though it was later tabled.

Weston created a National Health and Fitness Day bill, commenting: "On a personal level I just saw when I reached Ottawa how unhealthy was the lifestyle that MPs lead — so much time on airplanes and in committees and sitting in Parliament. I just resolved that if I was going to remain productive and useful to the people who voted me in, I needed to work at staying healthy."

In his column in The Tyee, political commentator Rafe Mair has been extremely critical of Weston's approach to environmental issues and his role as a Member of Parliament. Mair has repeatedly accused Weston of blindly adhering to Conservative Party policy on all issues. In an article dated January 19, 2015, Mair alleged that in Weston's time as an MP he had "never uttered a single word of criticism of any statement or action by the [Conservative] government". Weston and Mair are former colleagues from Mair's time as a BC MLA, and his role as minister responsible for constitutional reform during that period. Weston has responded to Mair by claiming that he carefully considers his position on environmental issues and comes to his own decision. In a responding letter to the editor, Weston also stated that Mair's critique had ignored the role of the democratic process and denigrated MPs' role in it.

In the 2015 federal election, he was defeated by Liberal candidate Pamela Goldsmith-Jones.

In the 2021 Canadian federal election, he was once again defeated, this time by incumbent Liberal MP Patrick Weiler

Electoral record

|-
|-

|Liberal
|Blair Wilson
|align="right"|23,867
|align="right"|37.50
|align="right"| +4.99
|align="right"|$82,304

|New Democratic Party
|Judith Wilson
|align="right"|12,766
|align="right"|20.06
|align="right"| -1.66
|align="right"|$50,621

|- bgcolor="white"
!align="right" colspan=3|Total valid votes
!align="right"|63,635
!align="right"|100.00
!align="right"|
!align="right"|
|- bgcolor="white"
!align="right" colspan=3|Total rejected ballots
!align="right"|144
!align="right"|0.23
!align="right"|0.0
!align="right"|
|- bgcolor="white"
!align="right" colspan=3|Turnout
!align="right"|63,635
!align="right"|68.6
!align="right"|+2.6
!align="right"|

|align="left" colspan=2|Liberal gain from Conservative
|align="right"|Swing
|align="right"| +2.2
|align="right"|

References

External links
Official Website
Parliamentary Website

1958 births
Living people
Canadian Baptists
Canadian expatriates in Taiwan
Conservative Party of Canada MPs
Lawyers in British Columbia
Members of the House of Commons of Canada from British Columbia
Osgoode Hall Law School alumni
Harvard College alumni
People from West Vancouver
Politicians from Vancouver
21st-century Canadian politicians